Sarvajña was a Kannada poet, pragmatist and philosopher of the 16th century. The word "Sarvajna" in Sanskrit literally means "the all knowing". His father was Kumbara Malla and his mother was Mallaladevi. His birth anniversary is celebrated on February 20 every year. He belongs to the caste of Kumbara. He is famous for his pithy three-lined poems called tripadi (written in the native three-line verse metre, "with three padas, a form of Vachana").  He is also referred as Sarvagna in modern translation.

Early life
The period of Sarvajña's life has not been determined accurately, and very little is known about his personal life.

See also
Thiruvalluvar
Vemana
Sarvajna and Tiruvalluvar statue installation

References
Sources
Medieval Indian Literature: An Anthology By K. Ayyappapanicker, Sahitya Akademi
Gandham Appa Rao, Vemana and Sarvajña, Progressive Literature (1982).
Anthology of Sarvajna's sayings, Kannada Sahitya Parishat (1978).
K. B Prabhu Prasad, Sarvajna, Sahitya Akademi (1987), reprint 1994 .

Notes

External links

 http://www.kalagnanam.in/vira-vasantaraya/

 know more about sarvajna and his poems
 Sarvajna's three-liners (Kannada page)
 Sarvajna's three-liners (with English translations)
 Picture of Sarvjna's Manuscript
 Sarvajna's vachana in Kannada
 Sarvagna's Tripadi with translation, transliteration and explanation
 200+ Collection of Sarvajna Vachanagalu(Android App)
 An app with Sarvagna Tripadis curated for application in today's world

Kannada poets
16th-century Indian poets
16th-century Indian philosophers
Lingayatism
People from Haveri district
Poets from Karnataka
Indian male poets
Scholars from Karnataka
Kannada Hindu saints